Mayachnoye is a rural locality (a selo) and the administrative center of Mayachninsky Selsoviet in Ikryaninsky District, Astrakhan Oblast, Russia. The population was 845 as of 2010. There are 10 streets.

Geography 
Mayachnoye is located 10 km south of Ikryanoye (the district's administrative centre) by road. Dolgy is the nearest rural locality.

References 

Rural localities in Ikryaninsky District